Turkish theatre  refers to theater activities in Turkey that emerged as  a unique and complex blend of theater traditions in the country and Western influences.

There are  four major theatrical traditions  that had greatly influenced each other: popular theater, court theater, and Western theater.

Theatre traditions

Folk theater
The  dramatic art has existed among the Turks for thousands of years. There are different views on the origins.  According to some scholars  it developed from humanistic ritual practiced in the Ural-Altaic region, whereas others argue that the Turkish folk theater is related with the folklore of the early Anatolian civilizations like Phrygia or Hitite civilizations. No matter what the origins are, the folk theater has survived for centuries among the  thousands of  villages scattered throughout the countryside. It largely consists of folk dramas performed by the villagers themselves during the family ceremonies or during the agriculture cycle. They are accompanied by pantomime, dances, and puppet performances.

Popular theater

Popular theater are performances presented to the public in places like public squares, coffee houses or  private homes by the storytellers, puppeteers or live actors. The performers belong to different guilds and societies, called “kol” or “cemaat”. 

Storytellers are called “meddah”. They tell either popular romances, national legends, religious narration or pseudo-historical romances.

Shadow theater is a form of theater  where cut-out figures silhouetted against a lighted screen.

Ortaoyunu (Middle show)  is The Turkish comedia dell'arte performed in urband areas  pastime for the middle classes.

Court theater
In Turkey, until the Westernized period, court theater simply imitated popular theater, formed in a more refined and literary manner. The performers of ocourt theater did non perform only for the aristocracy at the palaces; they performed at public festivites organized on the occasions such as  a court marriage, the birth of a new prince or his circumcision, the triumph in a war ,accession of a new ruler.

Western theater tradition
The westernization in Turkey started with vast plan of reforms in 1839  proved favorable for the development of the Western theatrical tradition in Turkey. The fusion of Western and Turkish dramatic forms accomplished largely through the efforts of Armenian middlemen. Agop Vartovyan (Güllü Agop) who headed the Ottoman Theater Company in Istanbul from 1867 to 1882 was one of the most important figures. 

In 1870, Güllü Agop was granted  a ten-year patent of monopoly for producing legitimate drama in the Turkish language at Istanbul. As a result, other  producers were encouraged to start theaters in the provinces. Turkish statesmen like Ziya Pasha and Ahmed Vefik Paşa were among those pioneers who started theater companies in provinces. 15 years following the  1908 revolution was a period wher many new theaters opened. Theater was regarded an ideal instrument for strengthening civilian and military morale as the country goes into one war after another including Italo-Turkish War, Balkan Wars, World War I. 

Following the establishment of the Republic of Turkey, the new government regarded the theater as an essential element for modernization of the country.  A state theatre company was estabished 1949. It is  supported by both government funds and ticket sales. By 2023, the State Theaters performes on stages at 12 provinces.

See also
Turkish State Theatres
Istanbul City Theatres
Culture of Turkey

References

Turkey